The 2019 Surbiton Trophy was a professional tennis tournament played on outdoor grass courts. It was the seventeenth and sixteenth editions of the tournament which was part of the 2019 ITF Women's World Tennis Tour and the 2019 ATP Challenger Tour. It took place in Surbiton, United Kingdom between 3 and 9 June 2019.

Men's singles main-draw entrants

Seeds

 1 Rankings are as of 27 May 2019.

Other entrants
The following players received wildcards into the singles main draw:
  Liam Broady
  Lloyd Glasspool
  Evan Hoyt
  Paul Jubb
  Ryan Peniston

The following players received entry from the qualifying draw:
  Luke Saville
  Andrew Watson

The following players received entry as lucky losers:
  Alastair Gray
  Brydan Klein

Women's singles main-draw entrants

Seeds

 1 Rankings are as of 27 May 2019.

Other entrants
The following players received wildcards into the singles main draw:
  Naiktha Bains
  Jodie Anna Burrage
  Katy Dunne
  Maia Lumsden

The following players received entry from the qualifying draw:
  Lizette Cabrera
  Caroline Dolehide
  Anna Kalinskaya
  Ann Li
  Caty McNally
  Ankita Raina

Champions

Men's singles

 Dan Evans def.  Viktor Troicki 6–2, 6–3.

Women's singles

 Alison Riske def.  Magdaléna Rybáriková, 6–7(5–7), 6–2, 6–2

Men's doubles

 Marcel Granollers /  Ben McLachlan def.  Kwon Soon-woo /  Ramkumar Ramanathan 4–6, 6–3, [10–2].

Women's doubles

 Jennifer Brady /  Caroline Dolehide def.  Heather Watson /  Yanina Wickmayer, 6–3, 6–4

References

External links
 2019 Surbiton Trophy at ITFtennis.com
 Official website

2019 ATP Challenger Tour
2019 ITF Women's World Tennis Tour
2019 in British sport
Aegon Surbiton Trophy
June 2019 sports events in the United Kingdom